The 2014 Clare Senior Hurling Championship was the 119th staging of the Clare Senior Hurling Championship since its establishment by the Clare County Board in 1887. The championship began on 17 May 2014 and ended on 5 October 2014.

Sixmilebridge were the defending champions, however, they failed to make it out of the group stage. Cratloe won the title following a 0-14 to 0-6 defeat of Crusheen in the final.

Cratloe won both the Clare Senior Hurling Championship and the Clare Senior Football Championship in 2014. This was the first time that a Clare club had lifted both senior club trophies on the field of play since Ennis Dalcassians completed "The Double" in 1929.

Senior Championship Knockout Stages

Quarter-finals
 Top two teams from each Senior A Group plus both Senior B Finalists.

Semi-finals

County Final

Championship statistics

Miscellaneous
 Cratloe won both the Clare Senior Hurling Championship and the Clare Senior Football Championship to win first 'Double' since Ennis Dalcassians in 1929.

References

External links

Clare Senior Hurling Championship
Clare Senior Hurling Championship